Chuuk Lagoon, previously Truk Atoll, is an atoll in the central Pacific. Weno city on Moen Island functions as both the atoll's capital and the state capital, and is the largest city in the FSM with its 13,700 people.

Chuuk Lagoon was the Empire of Japan's main naval base in the South Pacific theatre during World War II. It was the site of a major U.S. attack during Operation Hailstone in February 1944, and Operation Inmate, a small assault conducted by British and Canadian forces during June 1945.

Name
Chuuk means mountain in the Chuukese language. The lagoon was known mainly as Truk (a mispronunciation of Ruk), until 1990. Other names included Hogoleu, Torres, Ugulat, and Lugulus.

Geography
Chuuk Lagoon is part of the larger Caroline Islands group. The area consists of eleven major islands (corresponding to the eleven municipalities of Truk lagoon, which are Tol, Udot, Fala-Beguets, Romanum, and Eot of Faichuk group, and Weno, Fefen, Dublon, Uman, Param, and Tsis of Namoneas group) and forty-six smaller ones within the lagoon, plus forty-one on the fringing coral reef, and is known today as the Chuuk islands, part of the Federated States of Micronesia in the Pacific Ocean.

Table of main islands
This is the following list of islands, villages and population following the 2010 census:

Climate

History

Prehistory

It is not known when the islands of Chuuk were first settled, but archaeological evidence indicates that islands of Feefen and Wééné Islands had human settlements in the first and second century BC. Later evidence indicates that widespread human settlements appeared in Chuuk during the 14th century AD.

Colonialism

The first recorded sighting by Europeans was made by Spanish navigator Álvaro de Saavedra on board of the ship Florida during August or September 1528. They were later visited by Spaniard Alonso de Arellano on 15 January 1565 on board of galleon patache San Lucas.

As part of the Caroline Islands, Truk was claimed by the Spanish Empire, which made an effort to control the islands in the late 19th century. Chuuk lagoon was then inhabited by several tribes that engaged in intermittent warfare, as well as a small population of foreign traders and missionaries. Spanish control over the islands was nominal. The Spaniards stopped to raise a flag over Chuuk in 1886, and returned in 1895 as part of an attempt to assert control and negotiate peace between warring Chuukese tribes. No permanent Spanish settlement was ever established, and tribal violence continued until the German colonial era.

The Caroline Islands were sold to the German Empire in 1899, after Spain withdrew from the Pacific in the aftermath of the Spanish–American War.

During the First World War, The Japanese Navy was tasked with pursuing and destroying the German East Asiatic Squadron and protection of the shipping lanes for Allied commerce in the Pacific and Indian Oceans. During the course of this operation, the Japanese Navy seized the German possessions in the Marianas, Carolines, Marshall Islands and Palau groups by October 1914. Chuuk then became a possession of the Empire of Japan under a mandate from the League of Nations following Germany's defeat in World War I.

World War II

Naval Base Truk, during World War II in the Truk Lagoon was the Empire of Japan's main base in the South Pacific theatre. Truk was a heavily fortified base for Japanese operations against Allied forces in New Guinea and the Solomon Islands, serving as the forward anchorage for the Japanese Imperial Fleet.

Truk Lagoon was considered the most formidable of all Japanese strongholds in the Pacific. On the various islands, the Japanese Civil Engineering Department and Naval Construction Department had built roads, trenches, bunkers and caves. Five airstrips, seaplane bases, a torpedo boat station, submarine repair shops, a communications center and a radar station were constructed during the war. Protecting these various facilities were coastal defense guns and mortar emplacements. The Japanese garrison consisted of 27,856 IJN men, under the command of Vice Admiral Masami Kobayashi, then Vice Admiral Chuichi Hara, and 16,737 IJA men, under the command of Major General Kanenobu Ishuin. Due to its heavy fortifications, both natural and manmade, the base at Truk was known to Allied forces as "the Gibraltar of the Pacific".

A significant portion of the Japanese fleet was based at Truk, with its administrative center on Tonoas (south of Weno). At anchor in the lagoon, were the Imperial Japanese Navy's battleships, aircraft carriers, cruisers, destroyers, tankers, cargo ships, tugboats, gunboats, minesweepers, landing craft, and submarines. In particular; Yamato and Musashi were stationed at Truk for months around 1943, unable to participate in battle. Some have described Truk as Japan's equivalent of the Americans' Pearl Harbor.

In 1944, Truk's capacity as a naval base was destroyed through naval air attack in Operation Hailstone. Forewarned by intelligence a week before the US raid, the Japanese had withdrawn their larger warships (heavy cruisers and aircraft carriers) to Palau. Once the American forces captured the Marshall Islands, they used them as a base from which to launch an early morning attack on February 17, 1944, against Truk Lagoon. Operation Hailstone lasted for three days, as American carrier-based planes sank twelve smaller Japanese warships (light cruisers, destroyers, and auxiliaries) and thirty-two merchant ships, while destroying 275 aircraft, mainly on the ground. The consequences of the attack made "Truk lagoon the biggest graveyard of ships in the world".

The attacks for the most part ended Truk as a major threat to Allied operations in the central Pacific. The Japanese garrison on Eniwetok was denied any realistic hope of reinforcement and support during the invasion that began on February 18, 1944, greatly assisting U.S. forces in their conquest of that island. Truk was isolated by Allied forces, as they continued their advance towards Japan, by invading other Pacific islands, such as Guam, Saipan, Palau, and Iwo Jima. It was attacked again from 12 to 16 June 1945 by part of the British Pacific Fleet during Operation Inmate. Cut off, the Japanese forces on Truk and other central Pacific islands ran low on food and faced starvation before Japan surrendered in August 1945.

Recreational diving

In 1969, William A. Brown and French oceanographer Jacques Cousteau and his team explored Truk Lagoon. Following Cousteau's 1971 television documentary about the lagoon and its ghostly remains, the atoll became a scuba diving lure, drawing wreck diving enthusiasts from around the world to see its numerous, virtually intact sunken ships. The shipwrecks and remains are sometimes referred to as the "Ghost Fleet of Truk Lagoon". In waters devoid of normal ocean currents, divers can easily swim across decks littered with gas masks and depth charges and below deck can be found evidence of human remains. In the massive ships' holds are the remnants of fighter aircraft, tanks, bulldozers, railroad cars, motorcycles, torpedoes, mines, bombs, boxes of munitions, radios, plus thousands of other weapons, spare parts, and other artifacts. Of special interest is the wreck of the submarine I-169 Shinohara which was lost when diving to avoid the bombing. The submarine had participated in the attack on Pearl Harbor in December 1941.

The coral encrusted wrecks attract a diverse array of marine life, including manta rays, turtles, sharks and corals. In 2007, 266 species of reef fish were recorded by an Earthwatch team and in 2006 the rare coral Acropora pichoni was identified.

On 12 April 2011, the Australian Broadcasting Corporation (ABC) program Foreign Correspondent screened a report on Chuuk Lagoon likening the effect of the impending massive release of tens of thousands of tonnes of oil from the rusting Japanese warships into the coral reef to that of the Exxon Valdez spill in Alaska. However, given the poor state of the Japanese war effort in 1944, many of the ships may have had relatively small amounts of fuel in their bunkers. Environmental protection organizations are surveying the wrecks while also consulting with Japanese researchers to try to determine how much oil is likely to be in the hulks, particularly in three sunken oil tankers.

The ships are classified as a Japanese war grave, requiring Japanese government involvement in the eventual clean-up.
List of wrecks.

Economy and infrastructure

Most of the roads and transportation systems are poor or in disrepair; an extensive infrastructural redevelopment plan has begun.  It consists of a five-phase project to completely reconstruct the existing sewer, water and storm drainage systems as well as pour 10" concrete roadways in the majority of the villages of Weno.  Final contractual bidding was complete in late 2008 and construction began in June 2009.  Completion of Phase 1, which extends from the Chuuk International Airport through downtown into Mwan Village and encompassing the roadways to the financial center, hospital, governmental center and projected site of the College of Micronesia is slated for completion by 2012*. (*Updates needed as of 3-29-2021) Surveying for Phase 2, which extends from Mwan Village to Wiichap is underway.

The cost for a taxi ranges between  a dollar ($1) to two dollars ($2) depending on the distance traveled. Presently, a drive from the airport to the Blue Lagoon resort and dive shop could take up to 35 minutes to complete, although the distance is less than 5 miles. Chuuk International Airport (IATA airport code TKK) is on the administrative island of Moen.  It is served by United Airlines, formerly Continental Micronesia, locally known as Air Mike.

The government of the state operates a radio station.  Interisland communication is often accomplished using citizens' band radio. Telephone services are limited on Chuuk, though a cellular network is established within some islands of the lagoon and in the near future on the outer islands.  High speed Internet access via ADSL has been made available on a monthly subscription basis on the Island of Moen from May 2010.

Tourism, especially scuba diving among the many wrecks of Truk Lagoon, is the island's main industry with live-aboard dives amongst the most popular ways to see the hundreds of wrecks located in the shallow waters of the lagoon.  Copra, dried coconut meat, is the only cash crop and output is relatively insignificant.  Most of the inhabitants of outlying islands engage in subsistence activity only.

See also
List of United States National Historic Landmarks in United States commonwealths and territories, associated states, and foreign states
US Naval Base Carolines

Notes

References

External links
Shipwrecks of Chuuk Lagoon
Submarine I-169
Aviation: From Sand Dunes to Sonic Booms, a National Park Service Discover Our Shared Heritage Travel Itinerary
Chuuk Islands – The Blue and the Black ABC Foreign Correspondent

Chuuk State
Bodies of water of the Federated States of Micronesia
World War II sites in the Federated States of Micronesia
Wreck diving sites
Underwater diving sites in Micronesia
Lagoons of Oceania
National Register of Historic Places in the Federated States of Micronesia
World War II on the National Register of Historic Places
National Historic Landmarks in the Federated States of Micronesia